The Davis Scrub Nature Reserve is a protected nature reserve that is located in the Northern Rivers region of New South Wales, Australia.

The red-brown soil is derived from a basaltic flow from the nearby Mount Warning. Significant rainforest tree species include Moreton Bay Fig, Black Bean, White Booyong, Red Bean, and Purple Cherry. A large Moreton Bay Fig dominates the rainforest horizon.

The reserve is located at an altitude of 165 meters.

See also

 Booyong Flora Reserve
 Protected areas of New South Wales

References

External links

Nature reserves in New South Wales
Forests of New South Wales
Northern Rivers
Protected areas established in 1980
1980 establishments in Australia